This is a list of defunct airlines of Belgium.

See also

 List of airlines of Belgium
 List of airports in Belgium

References

Belgium
Airlines
Airlines, defunct